Phillis is both a surname and a given name. Notable people with the name include:

 Dennis Phillis (born 1948), Australian rules footballer
 Jodi Phillis (born 1965), Australian guitarist
 Rob Phillis (born 1956), Australian retired motorcycle road racer
 Tom Phillis (1931-1962), Australian Grand Prix motorcycle road racer
 Phillis Wheatley (1753-1784), first published African American poet

See also
 Operation Phillis, the British service-assisted evacuation operation for British citizens in Côte d'Ivoire in November 2004
 James Fillis
Phyllis (disambiguation)
 Phillips (disambiguation)